This list of 2018 motorsport champions is a list of national or international motorsport series with championships decided by the points or positions earned by a driver from multiple races where the season was completed during the 2018 calendar year.

Open wheel racing

Dirt oval racing

Drifting

Motorcycle racing

Dirt racing

Road racing

Rallying

Rallycross

Sports car and GT

Stock car racing

Touring cars

Truck racing

See also
 List of motorsport championships

References

Champions
2018